Halabja District was a district of the Sulaymaniyah Governorate, Kurdistan Region. In March 2014 the district was raised from district status to governorate status, becoming Halabja Governorate. Its nahiyahs (sub-districts) were elevated to become districts when the new governorate was formed. 

States and territories disestablished in 2014
Districts of Sulaymaniyah Province
Halabja Governorate